No Limits, sometimes No Limits!, is the second studio album by Belgian/Dutch Eurodance band 2 Unlimited, released in May 1993. The album yielded five singles, including "No Limit", which reached number one in many European charts. The album went platinum in several countries. It was fronted by Ray Slijngaard performing the main rap and Anita Dels providing the chorus.

Background
2 Unlimited had limited success in 1992 with their debut album, Get Ready!. It had produced four hit singles, but the album had not performed well commercially, peaking at just #37 in the UK Albums Chart. At the time, many Eurodance acts were able to produce hit singles but were unable to capitalize on this with a commercially successful album. 2 Unlimited, however, broke the mold.

At the end of 1992, 2 Unlimited were still only known amongst those who followed chart music at the time. With the first single released from this album, "No Limit", this changed. It went to number 1 in the UK Singles Chart in early February (competing with "I Will Always Love You" by Whitney Houston), and spent five weeks there. This exposure led to them being parodied by the mainstream media with the television series Spitting Image parodying the track as "No Lyrics" due to its repetitive lyrical content. The second single from the album, "Tribal Dance", was released in 1993, followed by this album soon afterwards.

Album name and artwork
Like all the studio albums by the band, the title of the album was a modification of the title of the lead single to be taken from it. The artwork for the UK cover was designed by Julian Barton and David Howells. As with all 2 Unlimited releases, most other territories featured a different album cover to the UK edition of the album. Unlike their previous album in the UK, where many of the tracks featured on it were instrumental, the artwork to this album featured band members Ray and Anita on the front cover.

Writing and composition
For the debut album, Get Ready!, most of the writing had been done by Wilde and de Coster, with some input from Ray Slijngaard and other featured writers. For No Limits!, both Ray and Anita had much more input into the song writing process compared to the previous album. Anita has writing credits on seven of the album's fourteen songs and Ray has writing credits on ten of them.

United Kingdom release
The United Kingdom version of No Limits, which was released on the PWL Continental label, is largely an instrumental album, having Ray Slijngaard's rap verses removed. The decision to do this was made by Pete Waterman, owner of the PWL record label. Waterman was also responsible for the removal of Slijngaard's rap verses from 2 Unlimited's single releases of Get Ready For This, Twilight Zone, Workaholic, The Magic Friend, No Limit, Tribal Dance and Faces.

This led to 2 Unlimited being mocked in the UK media, leading to nicknames like 2 Untalented, and Spitting Image's parody “There’s no lyrics”, along with ribbing by BBC Live & Kicking.

Critical reception

Despite its commercial success, at the time the album was panned by the critics, especially in the UK. But European magazine Music & Media gave a positive review, writing, "Those for whom "techno" is a pet hate always say "just push the button and out rolls another techno tune." It's not that simple of course, although this Dutch male/female duo has the gift to make you believe they do their thing in only two minutes. But isn't simplicity the hardest thing to achieve? Like a juke box this 16-track album is stuffed with potential singles, such as the extremely poppy The Power Age and Maximum Overdrive with a racing car breaking all speed limits." In Smash Hits, reviewer Mark Frith described the album as an "across the board techno splurge" and stated that this album contained clues as to why the band were unpopular in "elite dance circles". In the review of the single "Maximum Overdrive", the magazine reiterated that the band were, "not hard or imaginative and they have no credibility in dance circles."

The AllMusic review stated that beyond "No Limit" and "Let the Beat Control Your Body", there was little to recommend this album. Toby Anstis stated in his review of "Faces" that he "thought the album sounded all the same". Nonetheless, the band won the Best Dance Act award in Smash Hits that year as well as the World Music Award for Benelux.

Retrospective reviews of this album and the band in general have been more favourable. Only three years after the band split, they were described in a Guinness World Records publication as "spectacular" with the sound of "No Limit" being compared to "the sound giant dinosaurs might make stomping on cities". Their entry then goes on to describe their choruses as "chant-worthy" and that the singles from this album "ravaged hearts and minds across the globe", ending with the statement that they "linger forever in the hearts of true music lovers".

Track listing

Charts

Weekly charts

Year-end charts

Certifications and sales

Singles

Writing credits
The following personnel all have writing credits on this album.

 Phil Wilde
 Jean-Paul de Coster
 Ray Slijngaard
 Anita Dels
 Filip Martens
 Xavier de Clayton
 Peter Bauwens
 Michael Leahy
 Jan Voermans
 Bieman

References

1993 albums
2 Unlimited albums
Byte Records albums